King of the Bandits is a 1947 American Western film, directed by Christy Cabanne. It stars Gilbert Roland, Angela Greene, and Chris-Pin Martin, and was released on November 8, 1947.

Cast list
 Gilbert Roland as the Cisco Kid, aka Chico Villa
 Angela Greene as Alice Mason
 Chris-Pin Martin as Pancho
 Anthony Warde as Smoke Kirby
 Laura Treadwell as Mrs. Mason
 William Bakewell as Capt. Mason
 Rory Mallinson as Burl
 Pat Goldin as Pedro Gomez
 Cathy Carter as Connie
 Boyd Irwin as Col. Wayne

References

External links 
 
 
 

Monogram Pictures films
Films directed by Christy Cabanne
1947 Western (genre) films
1947 films
American Western (genre) films
American black-and-white films
1940s American films
1940s English-language films